The 1927 William & Mary Indians football team represented the College of William & Mary as a member of the Virginia Conference during  the 1927 college football season.
Led by J. Wilder Tasker in his fifth and final year as head coach, the Indians compiled an overall record of 4–5–1 with a mark of 2–0–1 in conference play, winning the Virginia Conference title.

Schedule

References

William and Mary
William & Mary Tribe football seasons
William and Mary Indians football